The Jack Smith Show was a radio program of popular music in the United States. It was broadcast on CBS Aug. 21, 1945-Dec. 26, 1952. It first originated from New York, but production was moved to Hollywood in 1948 to allow more opportunities for Smith to work in movies.

Format
Starring Smilin' Jack Smith (not to be confused with Whispering Jack Smith, who was also featured on musical programs on radio), The Jack Smith Show offered light music that was "more or less contrary to the crooning style that was popular during the time." One newspaper article described the program as "a fast moving musical mélange that puts the accent on informality and music."

Personnel
In addition to its star, The Jack Smith Show featured other singers as co-stars. At various times during the show's run they included Eugenie Baird, Dinah Shore, Ginny Simms, Martha Tilton, the Clark Sisters and Margaret Whiting. The program also featured guests, including Dorothy Shay, Kay Starr, Ella Fitzgerald, Martha Raye and The Pied Pipers.

Musical accompaniment was by Earl Sheldon and his orchestra and Herman Chittison Don Hancock was the announcer. William Brennan was the director.

See also
Club Fifteen and The Chesterfield Supper Club, programs similar in format to The Jack Smith Show

References

External links 
 Two episodes of The Jack Smith Show from Old Time Radio Researchers Group library
 Episodic log of The Jack Smith Show from RadioGOLDINdex
 Episodic log of The Jack Smith Show from Jerry Haendiges Vintage Radio Logs

1940s American radio programs
1950s American radio programs
American music radio programs
CBS Radio programs
1945 radio programme debuts
1952 radio programme endings